Corymbia henryi, commonly known as the large-leaved spotted gum, is a species of small to medium-sized tree that is endemic to north-eastern Australia. It has smooth, mottled bark, lance-shaped adult leaves, flower buds in groups of three, white or lemon yellow flowers and barrel-shaped to urn-shaped fruit.

Description
It has smooth, mottled grey, cream-coloured and pink bark. Flowering has been observed in January, April and November and the flowers are white or lemon-yellow.

This species is similar to some forms of C. citriodora but lacks the lemon-scented oils of that species and has larger leaves, flower buds and fruit.

Taxonomy and naming
Large-leaved spotted gum was first formally described in 1977 by Stanley Thatcher Blake in the journal Austrobaileya and given the name Eucalyptus henryi. Blake collected the type specimens near Stafford in 1956. In 1995, Ken Hill and Lawrie Johnson changed the name to Corymbia henryi. The specific epithet (henryi) honours "Mr. N. Henry of the Queensland Department of Forestry".

Distribution and habitat
Corymbia henryi grows in forest, usually on more or less level country from near Brisbane and Toowoomba in Queensland to near Glenreagh in New South Wales.

References

henryi
Myrtales of Australia
Flora of New South Wales
Flora of Queensland
Trees of Australia